"This Lil' Game We Play" is the lead single released from Subway's only album, Good Times. The song featured female R&B group 702 and was produced and written by Gerald Levert and Edwin "Tony" Nicholas.

Released late in 1994, by early 1995 "This Lil' Game We Play" became a major hit for the groups, spending 20 weeks on the Billboard Hot 100, reaching a peak of 15 during the week of April 15, 1995. By June 15, 1995, the single achieved a gold certification from the RIAA for sales of 500,000 copies. Despite the success of the single, neither Subway's album Good Times nor any of their follow-up singles were able to achieve much success and the group disbanded in 1996 without releasing another top-40 hit. 702 had a successful career in music, releasing three albums and obtaining several top-40 hits from 1996 to 2003.

Single track listing
"This Lil' Game We Play" (Pop Edit) - 4:00
"This Lil' Game We Play" (LP Version) - 4:53
"This Lil' Game We Play" (Instrumental) - 5:00
"This Lil' Game We Play" (Acapella) - 5:08

Chart performance

Weekly singles charts

Year-end charts

References

1994 debut singles
1994 songs
Songs written by Gerald Levert
Motown singles
Contemporary R&B ballads